Songs for Narcisse is the seventh studio album by Dogbowl, independently released in 2005 by Eyeball Planet.

Track listing

Personnel 
Adapted from Songs for Narcisse liner notes.
 Dogbowl – vocals, guitar, production, recording, mixing, cover art
Musicians
 Sidney Fleshflower – bass guitar
 Kiss-Kiss – electronic harpsitron
 Stephanie Samplestein – drums

Release history

References

External links 
 Songs for Narcisse at Discogs (list of releases)

2005 albums
Dogbowl albums